The 2021–22 Appalachian State Mountaineers women's basketball team represented Appalachian State University during the 2021–22 NCAA Division I women's basketball season. The basketball team, were led by eighth-year head coach Angel Elderkin, and played all home games at the Holmes Center along with the Appalachian State Mountaineers men's basketball team. They were members of the Sun Belt Conference.

Roster

Schedule and results

|-
!colspan=9 style=| Non-conference Regular Season
|-

|-
!colspan=9 style=| Conference Regular Season
|-

|-
!colspan=9 style=| Sun Belt Tournament

See also
 2021–22 Appalachian State Mountaineers men's basketball team

References

Appalachian State Mountaineers women's basketball seasons
Appalachian State Mountaineers
Appalachian State Mountaineers women's basketball
Appalachian State Mountaineers women's basketball